Geras is a town in Lower Austria in the district of Horn in Austria.

Population

References

External links

Cities and towns in Horn District